Tamba lineifera is a moth of the family Erebidae.

References

External links

Moths of Asia
Moths described in 1865
Boletobiinae